Ali ibn Attiya ibn al-Zaqqaq (c. 1100 Valencia - 1133 or 1134) was one of the great poets of Al-Andalus during the reign of the Almoravids. He was a Muslim from Banu Lakhm. His mother was the sister of fellow Andalusian poet, Ibn Khafaja, and there is scholarly dispute regarding his father. He was a disciple under philosopher Ibn Ṣîd de Badajoz.

The patrons of Ibn al-Zaqqaq were two Valencian families, a governor, a family of Almoravid dignitaries, probably the supreme Almoravid judge of the East and perhaps the Almoravid ruler Ali ibn Yusuf himself. He wrote mostly panegyric qasidas, in a time where poetry of that kind was quickly leaving patrons' payrolls in other areas of Spain.

El sueño de Al-Zaqqâq by Luis Delgado is a collection of the works of Ibn Al-Zaqqaq set to music.

Reception
Literary historian Emilio García Gómez referred to al-Zaqqaq's descriptive poetry as "the dramatization of metaphor".

References

Further reading
Poesías / Ibn Al-Zaqqāq ; edición y traducción en verso [del árabe] de Emilio García Gómez, Publicación Madrid : Instituto Hispano-Arabe de Cultura, 1986

External links
Ibn al-Zaqqaq al-Balansi, Trad. Ramon Dachs i Josep Ramon Gregori, Robaiyat d'Ibn al-Zaqqaq de València (examples of his work plus trl. in Spanish) (retrieved September 15, 2010)
El Zoco sin compradores. Poesía al Andalus S. XI-XIII Modest Solans, Granada.  Edición bilingüe, Muret 2018. 

1100s births
1130s deaths
12th-century writers from al-Andalus
Poets from al-Andalus
Year of birth uncertain
Year of death uncertain